Castellano is a Spanish and Italian surname.  Notable people with the surname include:
Abel Castellano Jr. (born 1983), Venezuelan jockey
Dani Castellano (born 1987), Spanish footballer
Daniel Castellano (born 1972), Venezuelan journalist, writer and researcher
Fabio Castellano (born 1998), Italian professional footballer 
Franco Castellano (1925 – 1999), Italian screenwriter and film director
Frank Castellano (born  1964), Commander of USS Bainbridge during hostage rescue
Javi Castellano (born 1987), Spanish professional footballer
Javier Castellano (born 1977), Venezuelan jockey
José María Castellano, (born 1947), Spanish businessman
Manuel Castellano (disambiguation), multiple people
Mateo Castellano (born 1996), Argentine footballer 
Paco Castellano (born 1944), Spanish retired footballer
Paul Castellano (1915-1985), American mafia boss
Pedro Castellano (born 1970), Venezuelan baseball player
Ramón Castellano de Torres (born 1947), Spanish expressionist painter
Ramón José Castellano (1903–1979), Argentine Archbishop of Córdoba
Richard S. Castellano (1933–1988), American actor
Richie Castellano (born 1980), American bandleader, singer, songwriter and musician
Talia Castellano (1999–2013), American blogger
Tomás M. Castellano (1884-1921), Spanish poet 
Torry Castellano (born 1979), drummer of The Donnas
Vittorio Castellano (1909–1997), Italian statistician

See also
 Castellani, a surname
 Castellanos (surname)

Italian-language surnames
Spanish-language surnames